Westley Sissel Unseld Sr. (March 14, 1946June 2, 2020) was an American professional basketball player, coach and executive. He spent his entire National Basketball Association (NBA) career with the Baltimore/Capital/Washington Bullets. Unseld played college basketball for the Louisville Cardinals and was selected with the second overall pick by the Bullets in the 1968 NBA draft. He was named the NBA Most Valuable Player and NBA Rookie of the Year during his rookie season and joined Wilt Chamberlain as the only two players in NBA history to accomplish the feat. Unseld won an NBA championship with the Bullets in 1978, and the Finals MVP award to go with it. After retiring from playing in 1981, he worked with the Bullets/Wizards as a vice president, head coach, and general manager.

Unseld was inducted into the Naismith Memorial Basketball Hall of Fame in 1988 and the National Collegiate Basketball Hall of Fame in 2006. His son, Wes Unseld Jr., is currently the head coach of the Washington Wizards.

Early life and high school career
Unseld was born in Louisville, Kentucky, to Charles and Cornelia Unseld as one of nine children. His father was a prizefighter, construction worker, oilman, and baseball player for the Indianapolis Clowns.

Unseld starred for the Seneca High School team that won Kentucky state championships in 1963 and 1964. He was recruited by over 100 colleges, and became the first African-American athlete to be offered an athletic scholarship to the University of Kentucky in Lexington. Integration leaders in Louisville tried to persuade Unseld to attend the University of Kentucky and stated that "it would be good for Kentucky and the Southeastern Conference," but Unseld opted to stay in town and attend the University of Louisville, which was racially integrated.

College career

Unseld played center for the school's freshman team and averaged 35.8 points and 23.6 rebounds over 14 games. He lettered for Louisville as a sophomore (1965–66), junior (1966–67), and senior (1967–68), scored 1,686 points (20.6 average) and grabbed 1,551 rebounds (18.9 average) over 82 games. He led the Missouri Valley Conference in rebounding all three years.

Unseld earned NCAA All-American honors in 1967 and 1968 and led Louisville to a 60–22 record during his collegiate career, making trips to the National Invitation Tournament (NIT) in 1966 and the NCAA tournament in 1967 and 1968. He was a member of Alpha Phi Alpha fraternity.

Professional career

Unseld was selected as the second overall pick by the Baltimore Bullets in the 1968 NBA draft. He was also selected by his hometown Kentucky Colonels of the American Basketball Association (ABA) in the 1968 ABA draft. Unseld was offered contracts by both teams but opted to sign with the Bullets of the more successful NBA despite them allegedly offering less money. After signing Unseld, Bullets owner Earl Foreman proclaimed that "this contract represents the most attractive and rewarding contract that has or will be signed by any player in the NBA this year."

In his first regular season game, Unseld recorded eight points and 22 rebounds in a 124–116 Baltimore win over the Detroit Pistons. On October 19, Unseld recorded his first double-double of his career after recording 13 points and 20 rebounds in a 124–121 loss to the Philadelphia 76ers. On November 22, Unseld recorded 20 points and a career-high 29 rebounds in a 121–110 loss to the 76ers.

As a rookie, Unseld helped lead the Bullets (which had finished in last place in the Eastern division the previous year) to a  record and a division title. Unseld averaged 18.2 rebounds per game that year, and joined fellow future Hall of Famer Wilt Chamberlain to become the second player ever to win the Rookie of the Year Award and the Most Valuable Player Award in the same year. Unseld was also named to the NBA All-Rookie First Team, and also claimed the Sporting News MVP that year.

The following season, he led the NBA in field goal percentage with a .561 percentage.

First with star ball-handler Earl Monroe and renowned two-way player Gus Johnson, and later with dominant center-turned-power-forward Elvin Hayes and experienced wing Bob Dandridge, Unseld played a key role in the Bullets making four NBA Finals appearances from 1971 to 1979, and won the championship in 1978 over the Seattle SuperSonics, in which he was named the Finals MVP. He ended his playing career in March 1981, and his No. 41 jersey was retired by the Bullets shortly thereafter.

Player profile
Famed for his rebounding, bone-jarring picks and ability to ignite a fast break with his crisp, accurate outlet passes, Unseld made up for his lack of height as a center with brute strength and sheer determination. In 984 NBA games – all with the Bullets – Unseld averaged a double-double in points and rebounds, with averages of 10.8 points and 14.0 rebounds per game. He also averaged 3.9 assists, excellent for a center, in the 36 minutes he played per game. Unseld was inducted into the Naismith Memorial Basketball Hall of Fame in 1988, and in 1996, he was named as one of the NBA's 50 Greatest Players of all time. In 2021, he was named on the NBA 75th Anniversary Team. To commemorate the NBA's 75th Anniversary The Athletic ranked their top 75 players of all time, and named Unseld as the 60th greatest player in NBA history.

Executive and coaching career
After Unseld's retirement in 1981, he moved into a front office position with the Bullets, where he served as vice president for six years before being named head coach in 1988. He resigned following the 1994 season with a 202–345 record (.369). Unseld became the Bullets' general manager in 1996 (they were renamed to the Wizards in 1997) and served in that role for seven years. He guided the team to the playoffs once during his tenure as general manager.

Personal life
Unseld's wife, Connie, opened Unselds School in 1979. A coed private school located in southwest Baltimore, it has a daycare program, nursery school and a kindergarten-to-eighth grade curriculum. Connie and daughter Kimberly served as teachers at the school. Unseld worked as an office manager and head basketball coach. He was the godfather of Cleveland Cavaliers all-star forward, Kevin Love, as Kevin's father Stan Love was a teammate of Unseld's on the Baltimore Bullets. His son, Wes Unseld Jr., is a coach in the NBA who became the head coach of the Wizards in 2021.

Death
Unseld died on June 2, 2020, after suffering lengthy health battles.

NBA career statistics

Playing

Source:

|+NBA regular season playing statistics
|-
| style="text-align:left;"|
| style="text-align:left;"|Baltimore
| 82 ||  || 36.2 || .476 ||  || .605 || 18.2 || 2.6 ||  ||  || 13.8
|-
| style="text-align:left;"|
| style="text-align:left;"|Baltimore
| style="background:#cfecec;"|82* ||  || 39.4 || .518 ||  || .638 || 16.7 || 3.5 ||  ||  || 16.2
|-
| style="text-align:left;"|
| style="text-align:left;"|Baltimore
| 74 ||  || 39.2 || .501 ||  || .657 || 16.9 || 4.0 ||  ||  || 14.1
|-
| style="text-align:left;"|
| style="text-align:left;"|Baltimore
| 76 ||  || 41.7 || .498 ||  || .629 || 17.6 || 3.7 ||  ||  || 13.0
|-
| style="text-align:left;"|
| style="text-align:left;"|Baltimore
| 79 ||  || 39.1 || .493 ||  || .703 || 15.9 || 4.4 ||  ||  || 12.5
|-
| style="text-align:left;"|
| style="text-align:left;"|Capital
| 56 ||  || 30.8 || .438 ||  || .655 || 9.2 || 2.8 || 1.0 || .3 || 5.9
|-
| style="text-align:left;"|
| style="text-align:left;"|Washington
| 73 ||  || 39.8 || .502 ||  || .685 || style="background:#cfecec;"|14.8* || 4.1 || 1.6 || .9 || 9.2
|-
| style="text-align:left;"|
| style="text-align:left;"|Washington
| 78 ||  || 37.5 || style="background:#cfecec;"|.561* ||  || .585 || 13.3 || 5.2 || 1.1 || .8 || 9.6
|-
| style="text-align:left;"|
| style="text-align:left;"|Washington
| 82 ||  || 34.9 || .490 ||  || .602 || 10.7 || 4.4 || 1.1 || .5 || 7.8
|-
| style="text-align:left; background:#afe6ba;"|†
| style="text-align:left;"|Washington
| 80 ||  || 33.1 || .523 ||  || .538 || 11.9 || 4.1 || 1.2 || .6 || 7.6
|-
| style="text-align:left;"|
| style="text-align:left;"|Washington
| 77 ||  || 31.2 || .577 ||  || .643 || 10.8 || 4.1 || .9 || .5 || 10.9
|-
| style="text-align:left;"|
| style="text-align:left;"|Washington
| 82 ||  || 36.3 || .513 || .500 || .665 || 13.3 || 4.5 || .8 || .7 || 9.7
|-
| style="text-align:left;"|
| style="text-align:left;"|Washington
| 63 ||  || 32.3 || .524 || .500 || .640 || 10.7 || 2.7 || .8 || .6 || 8.0
|- class="sortbottom"
| style="text-align:center;" colspan="2"|Career
| 984 ||  || 36.4 || .509 || .500 || .633 || 14.0 || 3.9 || 1.1 || .6 || 10.8
|- class="sortbottom"
| style="text-align:center;" colspan="2"|All-Star
| 5 || 0 || 15.4 || .500 ||  || .600 || 7.2 || 1.2 || .4 || .0 || 6.2

|+NBA playoff playing statistics
|-
| style="text-align:left;"|1969
| style="text-align:left;”|Baltimore
| 4 ||  || 41.3 || .526 ||  || .789 || 18.5 || 1.3 ||  ||  || 18.8
|-
| style="text-align:left;"|1970
| style="text-align:left;”|Baltimore
| 7 ||  || 41.3 || .414 ||  || .789 || 23.6 || 3.4 ||  ||  || 10.4
|-
| style="text-align:left;"|1971
| style="text-align:left;”|Baltimore
| 18 ||  || 42.2 || .462 ||  || .568 || 18.8 || 3.8 ||  ||  || 13.2
|-
| style="text-align:left;"|1972
| style="text-align:left;”|Baltimore
| 6 ||  || 44.3 || .492 ||  || .526 || 12.5 || 4.2 ||  ||  || 12.3
|-
| style="text-align:left;"|1973
| style="text-align:left;”|Baltimore
| 5 ||  || 40.2 || .417 ||  || .474 || 15.2 || 3.4 ||  ||  || 9.8
|-
| style="text-align:left;"|1974
| style="text-align:left;”|Capital
| 7 ||  || 42.4 || .492 ||  || .600 || 12.1 || 3.9 || .6 || .1 || 10.1
|-
| style="text-align:left;"|1975
| style="text-align:left;”|Washington
| 17 ||  || 43.2 || .546 ||  || .656 || 16.2 || 3.8 || .9 || 1.2 || 10.7
|-
| style="text-align:left;"|1976
| style="text-align:left;”|Washington
| 7 ||  || 44.3 || .462 ||  || .542 || 12.1 || 4.0 || .9 || .6 || 7.0
|-
| style="text-align:left;"|1977
| style="text-align:left;”|Washington
| 9 ||  || 40.9 || .556 ||  || .583 || 11.7 || 4.9 || .9 || .7 || 7.4
|-
| style="text-align:left; background:#afe6ba;"|1978†
| style="text-align:left;”|Washington
| 18 ||  || 37.6 || .530 ||  || .587 || 12.0 || 4.4 || .9 || .4 || 9.4
|-
| style="text-align:left;"|1979
| style="text-align:left;”|Washington
| 19 ||  || 38.7 || .494 ||  || .609 || 13.3 || 3.4 || .9 || .7 || 10.3
|-
| style="text-align:left;"|1980
| style="text-align:left;”|Washington
| 2 ||  || 43.5 || .500 || .000 || .667 || 14.0 || 3.5 || .0 || 1.5 || 9.0
|- class="sortbottom"
| style="text-align:center;" colspan="2"|Career
| 119 ||  || 41.1 || .493 || .000 || .608 || 14.9 || 3.8 || .8 || .7 || 10.6

Coaching
Source:

|-
| style="text-align:left;"|Washington
| style="text-align:left;"|
| 55 || 30 || 25 ||  || style="text-align:center;"|2nd in Atlantic || 5 || 2 || 3 || 
| style="text-align:center;"|Lost in first round
|-
| style="text-align:left;"|Washington
| style="text-align:left;"|
| 82 || 40 || 42 ||  || style="text-align:center;"|4th in Atlantic || — || — || — || —
| style="text-align:center;"|Missed playoffs
|-
| style="text-align:left;"|Washington
| style="text-align:left;"|
| 82 || 31 || 51 ||  || style="text-align:center;"|4th in Atlantic || — || — || — || —
| style="text-align:center;"|Missed playoffs
|-
| style="text-align:left;"|Washington
| style="text-align:left;"|
| 82 || 30 || 52 ||  || style="text-align:center;"|4th in Atlantic || — || — || — || —
| style="text-align:center;"|Missed playoffs
|-
| style="text-align:left;"|Washington
| style="text-align:left;"|
| 82 || 25 || 57 ||  || style="text-align:center;"|6th in Atlantic || — || — || — || —
| style="text-align:center;"|Missed playoffs
|-
| style="text-align:left;"|Washington
| style="text-align:left;"|
| 82 || 22 || 60 ||  || style="text-align:center;"|7th in Atlantic || — || — || — || —
| style="text-align:center;"|Missed playoffs
|-
| style="text-align:left;"|Washington
| style="text-align:left;"|
| 82 || 24 || 58 ||  || style="text-align:center;"|7th in Atlantic || — || — || — || —
| style="text-align:center;"|Missed playoffs
|- class="sortbottom"
| style="text-align:center;" colspan="2"|Career
| 547 || 202 || 345 ||  ||   || 5 || 2 || 3 ||  ||

See also
 List of National Basketball Association career rebounding leaders
 List of National Basketball Association career playoff rebounding leaders
 List of National Basketball Association annual rebounding leaders
 List of National Basketball Association players with most rebounds in a game
 List of NCAA Division I men's basketball career rebounding leaders
 List of people from the Louisville metropolitan area
 List of University of Louisville people

References

External links

 
 

1946 births
2020 deaths
African-American basketball coaches
African-American basketball players
African-American sports executives and administrators
All-American college men's basketball players
American men's basketball coaches
American men's basketball players
American sports executives and administrators
Baltimore Bullets (1963–1973) draft picks
Baltimore Bullets (1963–1973) players
Basketball coaches from Kentucky
Basketball players at the 1967 Pan American Games
Basketball players from Louisville, Kentucky
Capital Bullets players
Centers (basketball)
Kentucky Colonels draft picks
Louisville Cardinals men's basketball players
Medalists at the 1967 Pan American Games
Medalists at the 1967 Summer Universiade
Naismith Memorial Basketball Hall of Fame inductees
National Basketball Association All-Stars
National Basketball Association broadcasters
National Basketball Association players with retired numbers
Pan American Games gold medalists for the United States
Pan American Games medalists in basketball
Parade High School All-Americans (boys' basketball)
Seneca High School (Louisville, Kentucky) alumni
Sportspeople from Louisville, Kentucky
Universiade gold medalists for the United States
Universiade medalists in basketball
Washington Bullets head coaches
Washington Bullets players
Washington Wizards executives
20th-century African-American sportspeople
21st-century African-American people